Wypychy may refer to the following places:
Wypychy, Masovian Voivodeship (east-central Poland)
Wypychy, Bielsk County in Podlaskie Voivodeship (north-east Poland)
Wypychy, Grajewo County in Podlaskie Voivodeship (north-east Poland)